Bruce Bespalow Dan, M.D. (December 20, 1946 – September 6, 2011) was one of the American researchers with the Toxic Shock Syndrome Task Force who established the link between toxic shock syndrome and the use of tampons.

Dan died September 6, 2011 in Baltimore, Maryland from complications stemming from a bone marrow transplant received to cure leukemia.  He is buried in Garden of Remembrance Cemetery, Clarksburg, Maryland.

Notes

1946 births
2011 deaths
American medical researchers
Place of birth missing